The Lithuanian Capital of Culture is a city designated for a period of one calendar year during which it is given a chance to showcase its cultural life and cultural development. First time programme was held in 2008.

Cities 
2008: Zarasai
2009: Plungė
2010: Ramygala
2011: Šilutė
2012: Anykščiai
2013: Palanga
2014: Panevėžys
2015: Žagarė
2016: Telšiai
2017: Klaipėda
2018: Marijampolė
2019: Rokiškis
2020: Trakai
2021: Neringa
2022: Alytus

Entertainment events in Lithuania
2008 establishments in Lithuania
Annual events in Lithuania